Up10tion (pronounced eobtensyeon for "up tension", acronym for Unbelievable Perfect 10 members Teenager Idol Open Now) is a South Korean boy band formed by TOP Media in 2015. The group currently consists of seven members: Kuhn, Kogyeol, Bitto, Sunyoul, Gyujin, and Xiao. The group debuted with their first extended play Top Secret. In 2017, they made their Japanese debut with EP ID. Originally as ten, Jinhoo, Lee Jin-hyuk and Kim Woo-seok departed from the group on February 28, 2023, and Hwanhee departed from the group on March 20, 2023.

History

Pre-debut 
In July 2015, Up10tion introduced its members through a parody of MBC's King of Mask Singer.

2015: Debut with Top Secret and Bravo! 
On September 9, Up10tion held a debut showcase at AX Concert Hall in Seoul which 500 fans attended. Up10tion released their debut EP Top Secret, which includes the debut single "So, Dangerous", was released on September 11, 2015. The album debut at number 9 and peaked at number 7 on Gaon Album Chart. They made their official music program debut on September 10 through Mnet's M Countdown, performing their debut single "So, Dangerous". They also had their debut album showcase in Beijing, China on September 22. The "So, Dangerous" music video was ranked 9th place in Billboards Most Viewed K-pop Videos in America for the month of September 2015.

On November 26, Up10tion released their second EP Bravo! with the lead single "Catch Me!", which was produced by Iggy and Yong Bae, who produced Ailee's "Heaven" and GFriend's "Me Gustas Tu". It also includes the track "Party2nite", which was written and composed by Teen Top's Changjo. The album peaked at number 5 on Gaon Album Chart.

2016: Spotlight, Summer Go! and Burst 
Up10tion released their third EP Spotlight with the lead single "Attention" on April 18.

On August 5, Up10tion released their fourth EP Summer Go! with the lead single "Tonight".

Up10tion released their fifth EP Burst with the lead single "White Night" on November 21.

2017: Japanese debut, Japanese tour and Star;dom 
Up10tion released their Japanese debut single "ID" (アイディー) on February 27. They launched their first Japan tour titled "Zepp Tour 2017 ID" in May.

On June 6, TOP Media issued a statement regarding Wooseok's hiatus. It was stated that his psychological condition had worsened due to the mental stress that he had been receiving since the end of 2016, due to a controversy that alleged he had inappropriately touched his "The Show" co-host, Jeon So-mi, near her chest area during a video. There were official statements released by both parties' agencies that denied these claims, along with the production staff from "The Show".

With Wooseok on hiatus, Up10tion continued their activities as nine members. They released their sixth mini album Star;dom on June 29. The EP contained six tracks, including lead single "Runner". On October 12, the group released 2017 Special Photo Edition, containing two tracks, including lead single "Going Crazy".

2018: First full-length album Invitation, first world tour and Laberinto 
On January 20, Up10tion released their second Japanese single album "Wild Love".

On March 15, Up10tion released their first studio album Invitation with title track "Candyland" which contain 10 other tracks. Wooseok returned to the group which ended his 8-month hiatus.

In May, Up10tion started their first tour Up10tion Japan Live Tour 2018. In June, the group started their second tour, "Up10tion 1st US Meet & Live Tour "Candyland" in 8 cities.

On August 8, Up10tion released their third Japan single album "Chaser". On August 20, Up10tion released 2018 Special Photo Edition with the single "So Beautiful".

On September 19, Up10tion started their third tour, Up10tion Europe Tour.

On December 6, Up10tion released their seventh EP Laberinto, with the lead single "Blue Rose".

2019: Produce X 101 and members hiatus 
On May 31, Up10tion started their 4th tour "Laberinto Tour in North America" without Wooseok and Jinhyuk.
Jinhyuk and Wooseok were contestants on Produce X 101, with Wooseok being a finalist and in August, became a member of the new boy group X1. The group subsequently disbanded due to the Mnet vote manipulation investigation.

On August 22, Up10tion released The Moment of Illusion with the lead single "Your Gravity", which was promoted without Wooseok and Jinhyuk. Jinhyuk meanwhile debuted as a soloist in November.

2020: Light Up and Jinhoo's enlistment
On April 7, TOP Media announced Jinhoo will go on a hiatus due to health concerns. They also announced the group will be having a summer album but it did not happen until the comeback was announced in  late August.

Up10tion's new EP, Light Up with the single "Light", was released on September 24. On November 23, it was announced that Jinhoo would begin his mandatory military service on the same day.

On November 27, Up10tion released "Destiny" which was part of their Light Up album.

On November 29, Bitto tested positive for COVID-19. On December 1, Kogyeol also tested positive for COVID-19. On December 15, Xiao tested positive for COVID-19.

As of December 30, all 3 members have recovered from COVID-19.

2021–2022: Connection, Novella and Code Name: Arrow
On June 14, 2021, Up10tion returned with their second studio album Connection with the accompanying lead single "Spin Off".

On January 3, 2022, Up10tion released their tenth EP Novella with "Crazy About You" serving their accompanying track.

On May 22, member Jinhoo was discharged from the military service.

On September 15, it was announced that Up10tion had a comeback on October 12, with their eleventh extended play Code Name: Arrow.

2023-present: Boys Planet and members' hiatus and military service 
On December 29, 2022, Hwanhee and Xiao became contestants on Boys Planet.

On February 28, 2023, it was announced that Lee Jin-hyuk would be leaving TOP Media after deciding not to renew his contract which expires on March 11. It was also announced that Kuhn, Kogyeol, Bitto, Sunyoul and Gyujin would also be leaving the agency, but Up10tion would continue with its current seven-member lineup, confirming Jinhoo and Wooshin's departure from the group as well.

In March 2023, TOP Media announced that members Kuhn and Kogyeol will be enlisting in the military on March 27 and April 10, respectively.

On March 20, 2023, Top Media announced that Hwanhee's contract has ended.

Members 
Adapted from their Naver profile

Current 
 Kuhn (쿤) – co-leader, rapper, vocalist
 Kogyeol (고결) – vocalist
 Bitto (비토) – rapper
 Sunyoul (선율) – vocalist
 Gyujin (규진) – vocalist

Inactive 
 Hwanhee (환희) – vocalist (inactive due to Boys Planet participation)
 Xiao (샤오) – vocalist (inactive due to Boys Planet participation)

Former 
 Jinhoo (Hangul: 진후) – leader, vocalist
 Lee Jin-hyuk (formerly known as Wei) (이진혁) – rapper
 Kim Woo-seok (formerly known as Wooshin) (김우석) – vocalist

Timeline

Yellow = Active
Black = Inactive / Hiatus

Discography

Studio albums

Extended plays

Singles

Videography

Music videos

Tours 
 2017: Up10tion "Zepp Tour 2017 ID"
2018: Up10tion JAPAN Live Tour 2018 CANDYLAND
 2018: Up10tion 1st Us Meet & Live Tour "Candyland"
 2018: Up10tion Europe Tour
 2019: Laberinto Tour in North America

Awards and nominations

Notes

References

External links

  

South Korean boy bands
South Korean dance music groups
Musical groups established in 2015
K-pop music groups
Musical groups from Seoul
2015 establishments in South Korea